Saginaw Morgan Grant (July 20, 1936 – July 27, 2021) was a Native American character actor.  He appeared in The Lone Ranger, The World's Fastest Indian, Community, and Breaking Bad and was a musician, pow wow dancer, motivational speaker and the Hereditary Chief of the Sac and Fox Nation.

Early life
Saginaw Morgan Grant was born at the Indian Hospital in Pawnee, Oklahoma on July 20, 1936, the son of Sarah (née Murray) and Austin Grant. He was a member of the Sac and Fox Nation of Oklahoma. His mother's ancestry was from the Iowa and Otoe-Missouria tribes of Oklahoma. He was a United States Marine Corps veteran of the Korean War.

Career
Grant appeared in numerous films and television shows. He played Grey Cloud, an ally of Indiana Jones, opposite Harrison Ford in a 1993 episode "Mystery of the Blues" of The Young Indiana Jones Chronicles. During the 1993 television season Grant had the recurring role of Auggie Velasquez, owner of the small-town general store and trading post, in Harts of the West.

He played the Gatekeeper in the 1999 film Purgatory. He played Chief Big Bear in the 2013 film The Lone Ranger. The same year, Grant appeared as a man who sells his truck to Walter White in the Breaking Bad episode "Ozymandias."

From 2012, Grant was a prominent member of the American Indian Advisory Board at the San Diego International Film Festival.

Accolades
Grant was awarded the American Legacy Award from the San Diego Film Festival, the lifetime achievement award from the Oceanside International Film Festival and a Living Legend Award by the Native American Music Awards (NAMA). In 2018, his album "Don't Let the Drums Go Silent" won the Record of the Year from NAMA.

Death
Grant died in his sleep on July 27, 2021, at the age of 85. His friend and publicist said the cause of death was natural causes.

Filmography

Film
War Party - Freddie Man Wolf (1988)
Small Time - The Holy Man (1996)
Grey Owl - Brother of the Pow Wow Chief (1999)
Legend of the Phantom Rider - Medicine Man (2002)
Black Cloud - Grandpa (2004)
Social Guidance - Red Hightower (2005)
The World's Fastest Indian - Jake (2005)
Beyond the Quest - Apparition (2007)
Slipstream - Eddie (2007)
Maneater - Stanley Hipp (2009)
Walking on Turtle Island - Catches the Bear (2009)
Awful Nice - Jonas (2013)
Winter in the Blood - Yellow Calf (2013)
The Lone Ranger - Chief Big Bear (2013)
Wind Walkers - Native Elder (2015)
The Ridiculous 6  - Screaming Eagle (2015)
Valley of the Gods - Tall Bitter Water (2017)
Journey to Royal (and the 4th Emergency Rescue Squadron) - Himself (2017)

Television
The Young Indiana Jones Chronicles - episode - The Mystery of the Blues - Grey Cloud (1993)
Harts of the West - 15 episodes - Auggie (1993-1994)
The Last Frontier- episode -  The One with the Friends' Theme - Alaskan (1996)
Nash Bridges - Ol'Larry/1 episode (1997)
Stolen Women: Captured Heartss - Chief Luta/TV movie (1997)
Baywatch - Eyes That See At Night/1 episode (1997)
Purgatory - Ancient Gate Keeper/TV movie (1999)
Auf Wiedersehen, Pet - Medecine Man/3 episodes (2002)
Skinwalkers - Wilson Sam/TV movie (2002)
Miracles - Most Respected Elder/1 episode (2003)
DreamKeeper - Old Medecine Man/TV movie (2003)
The Fallen Ones - Joseph/TV movie (2005)
My Name is Earl - Dakota/1 episode (2005)
Saving Grace - Mudwa/1 episode (2007)
American Horror Story - Tribal Elder/1 episode (2011)
Eagleheart - Saginaw/1 episode (2012)
Family Tree - White Feather/1 episode (2013)
Breaking Bad - Native American Man - episode "Ozymandias" (2013)
Shameless - Great Grandfather/1 episode (2014)
Community - Chief Blue Sky/1 episode (2014)
The League - Sam/1 episode (2014)
Workaholics - American Indian Man/1 episode (2015)
Sin City Saints - Shaman/1 episode (2015)
Baskets - Old Man/1 episode (2016)
Veep - Marjorie's Grandpa/1 episode (2016)

References

External links

Saginaw Grant on Twitter
Saginaw Grant on Instagram

1936 births
2021 deaths
United States Marine Corps personnel of the Korean War
People from Pawnee, Oklahoma
Native American male actors
Native American actors
Native American United States military personnel
Sac and Fox people
20th-century Native Americans
21st-century Native Americans